Star Wars Detours is an unaired American CGI-animated comedy series. It is differentiated from the other Star Wars animated series in that it is a parody of the franchise. It offers a comedic take on what happened between the prequel trilogy (Episodes I–III) and the original trilogy (Episodes IV–VI). The series was produced by Lucasfilm Animation in collaboration with Robot Chicken creators Seth Green and Matthew Senreich. Although 39 episodes of the show have been produced, their release has been on hold since 2013, following Disney's acquisition of Lucasfilm.

Cast and crew
Voice actors that were involved in the show included Dee Bradley Baker, Abraham Benrubi, Ahmed Best as Jar Jar Binks, Anthony Daniels as C-3PO, Felicia Day, Donald Faison, Nat Faxon, Seth Green as Obi-Wan Kenobi, Jennifer Hale, Zachary Levi, Joel McHale, Breckin Meyer, Dan Milano, Andy Richter as Zuckuss, Cree Summer, Catherine Taber as Princess Leia, Billy Dee Williams as Lando Calrissian, "Weird Al" Yankovic as 4-LOM, Grey DeLisle, and Seth MacFarlane as Emperor Palpatine.

Writers for the series included Dan Milano, Tom Root, Zeb Wells, Doug Goldstein, Breckin Meyer, Kevin Shinick, David A. Goodman, Michael Price, and Jane Espenson. Brendan Hay served as head writer.

Release delay 
Footage of the series debuted at Star Wars Celebration VI in mid-2012; it was planned to be set between the events of Star Wars: Episode III – Revenge of the Sith and Episode IV – A New Hope. In March 2013, Lucasfilm postponed the release of the series, after reconsidering whether a comedy series would be a sensible way to introduce the franchise to new fans, when a sequel trilogy was being produced. That September, Seth Green said 39 episodes had been completed, with 62 additional scripts finished.

In October 2015, during a live stream of Life Is Strange, Felicia Day mentioned that the show had been canceled. In June 2018, Lucasfilm filed a new trademark for the series.

In November 2020, a six-minute episode, "Dog Day Afternoon", was leaked onto the internet. The episode features Zuckuss and 4-LOM (played by Andy Richter and "Weird Al" Yankovic) attempting to rob Dexter's Diner. Lando Calrissian, Boba Fett, and Jabba the Hutt also appear. The episode was taken down shortly after it was leaked.

In June 2021, Entertainment Weekly asked Green if he knew when the show might be released. He replied, "The most recent conversations I've had with anybody who would be in a position to say so say that it's not soon. ... the way it's been explained to me is that there hasn't been enough interest high enough up to go through what it would take to put it out, and that there isn't an interest in releasing this content on Disney+ from Lucasfilm."

In March 2022, "Weird Al" Yankovic revealed that he and other cast members had recorded original songs for the series, with the cancelled third season planned to feature a musical.

See also

 
 
 Tag and Bink

References

External links

American comic science fiction television series
Computer-animated television series
Detours
Unaired television shows
Interquel television series
Animated television shows based on films
Television series by Lucasfilm
Parody television series based on Star Wars